The James W. Clise House is a house built for and occupied by Seattle real estate pioneer James W. Clise (1855–1939) and his wife Anna Herr Clise (1866–1936). The house and 440-acre model dairy farm became Marymoor Park in Redmond, Washington, United States, and the house is listed on the National Register of Historic Places.

See also
 National Register of Historic Places listings in King County, Washington

References

1904 establishments in Washington (state)
Buildings and structures in Redmond, Washington
Houses completed in 1904
Houses in King County, Washington
Houses on the National Register of Historic Places in Washington (state)
National Register of Historic Places in King County, Washington